Harry Sandlin Mattice Jr. (born 1954) is a former United States district judge of the United States District Court for the Eastern District of Tennessee.

Education and career

Born in Chattanooga, Tennessee, Mattice received a Bachelor of Science degree from the University of Tennessee in 1976 and a Juris Doctor from the University of Tennessee College of Law in 1981. He was in private practice in Tennessee from 1981 to 2001. He was a senior counsel to the United States Senate Committee on Governmental Affairs in 1997. He was the United States Attorney for the Eastern District of Tennessee from 2001 to 2005.

Federal judicial service

On July 28, 2005, Mattice was nominated by President George W. Bush to a seat on the United States District Court for the Eastern District of Tennessee vacated by Robert Allan Edgar. Mattice was confirmed by the United States Senate on October 24, 2005, and received his commission on November 18, 2005. On October 8, 2019, Mattice announced his intent to take senior status on March 10, 2020. He retired from active service on September 30, 2021.

References

Sources

|-

1954 births
Living people
21st-century American judges
Judges of the United States District Court for the Eastern District of Tennessee
People from Chattanooga, Tennessee
United States Attorneys for the Eastern District of Tennessee
United States district court judges appointed by George W. Bush
University of Tennessee alumni
University of Tennessee College of Law alumni